The men's 400 metres event  at the 1999 IAAF World Indoor Championships was held on March 5–7.

Medalists

Results

Heats
First 2 of each heat (Q) and next 8 fastest (q) qualified for the semifinals.

Semifinals
First 2 of each semifinal qualified directly (Q) for the final.

Final

References
Results

400
400 metres at the World Athletics Indoor Championships